National Rally for Democracy  is a political party in Benin. RND was legally recognized on October 5, 1990.

In 1997 Abimbola Adébayo Anani became the party president.

In the 2001 presidential elections, Anani was supported by RND and the Popular Front for the Republic. Anani later withdrew in favour of Mathieu Kérékou.

Political parties in Benin